Toby Charles (born 1940) is a former Welsh football commentator.  He is best known in North America as the host of Soccer Made in Germany, which aired in US markets on PBS stations during the 1970s and 1980s.

References

Association football commentators
Living people
1940 births
Westdeutscher Rundfunk people
North American Soccer League (1968–1984) commentators
Date of birth missing (living people)